Unió Deportiva Cassà is a football team based in Cassà in the autonomous community of Catalonia. Founded in 1946, the team plays in Segona Catalana. The club's home ground is Estadi Municipal, which has a capacity of 2,000 spectators.

History
Founded in 1946.
In June 2010, the club was relegated to Preferent Territorial due to economic limitations.

Season to season

3 seasons in Tercera División

References

External links
fcf.cat profile

Football clubs in Catalonia
Association football clubs established in 1946
Divisiones Regionales de Fútbol clubs
1946 establishments in Spain